Events from the year 1580 in art.

Events
 Mannerism art period in Italy ends.

Works

Vincenzo Campi – The Fruit Seller (approximate date)
Gillis Coignet - Callisto
El Greco – Christ Carrying the Cross (approximate date)
Tintoretto – Danaë
Tintoretto - Baptism of Christ (approximate date)
Jacopo Zucchi - The Miracle of the Snow

Births
January 20 – Stefano Amadei, Italian still-life painter (died 1644)
July 18 – Giovanni Giacomo Semenza, Italian painter of the early Baroque period (died 1638)
?October - Willem Jacobsz Delff, Dutch painter (died 1638)
date unknown
Cesare Aretusi, Italian painter primarily of portraits (died 1612)
Friedrich Brentel, German printmaker in engraving and etching, and miniature painter (died 1651)
Giovanni Domenico Cappellino, Italian painter of the Renaissance period, active mainly in his natal city of Genoa (died 1651)
Castellino Castello, Italian painter of the Baroque period, active mainly in Genoa (died 1649)
Cornelis IJsbrantsz Cussens, Dutch draughtsman and glass painter (died 1618)
Lorenzo Garbieri, Italian painter (died 1654)
Sebastiano Ghezzi, Italian painter and architect (died 1645)
Giacomo Locatelli, Italian painter born at Verona (died 1628)
William Peake, English painter and printseller (died 1639)
Camillo Rizzi, Italian painter (died 1618)
Andries Stock, Dutch painter (died 1648)
Friedrich van Hulsen, Dutch printmaker and engraver (died 1665)
Jacob van Musscher, Dutch Golden Age painter (died 1623)
Alessandro Vitali,Italian painter of the late-Renaissance and Baroque periods (died 1650)
probable
Abdón Castañeda, Spanish Baroque painter (died 1629)
Luca Ciamberlano, Italian engraver (died unknown)
Louis Finson, Flemish painter of the Dutch Golden Age (died 1617)
Vincenzo Gotti, Italian painter of the Baroque period (died 1636)
Frans Hals, Dutch painter (died 1666)
Baltazar Kuncz, Polish sculptor and woodcarver (died 1650)
Diego de Leyva, Spanish religious painter (died 1637)
Hendrik Gerritsz Pot, Dutch painter (died 1657)
Hendrik van Steenwijk II, Dutch Baroque painter of architectural interiors (died 1649)
Francisco Varela, Spanish Baroque painter (died 1645)

Deaths
February 25 - Marx Weiß, German Gothic painter (born c.1518)
date unknown
Livio Agresti,  Italian painter of the late-Renaissance or Mannerist period (born 1508)
Giovan Battista della Cerva, Italian painter (born 1515)
Jean Chartier, French painter, draughtsman, printer and publisher (born 1500)
Hans Collaert, Flemish engraver (born 1525/1530)
Luca Longhi, Italian painter of the Mannerist period (born 1507)
probable - Girolamo Siciolante da Sermoneta Italian Mannerist painter active in Rome (born 1521)

References

 
Years of the 16th century in art